Inquisitor glauce is a species of sea snail, a marine gastropod mollusk in the family Pseudomelatomidae.

Description

Distribution
This marine species is endemic to Australia and occurs off of Queensland

References

 Smith, E.A. 1888. Diagnoses of new species of Pleurotomidae in the British Museum. Annals and Magazine of Natural History 6 2: 300-317 
 Hedley, C. 1908. Studies on Australian Mollusca. Part 10. Proceedings of the Linnean Society of New South Wales 33: 456-489
  W.H. Dall (1918) Notes on the nomenclature of the mollusks of the family Turritidae; Proceedings of The United States National Museum v. 54 (1918) 
  Hedley, C. 1922. A revision of the Australian Turridae. Records of the Australian Museum 13(6): 213-359, pls 42-56 
 Wells, F.E. 1994. A revision of the Recent Australian species of the turrid genera Inquisitor and Ptychobela. Journal of the Malacological Society of Australasia 15: 71-102

External links
 

glauce
Gastropods of Australia
Gastropods described in 1918